FTFC may refer to one of the following British association football clubs:
 Fairford Town F.C.
 Fakenham Town F.C.
 Fareham Town F.C.
 Farnham Town F.C.
 Faversham Town F.C.
 Fleet Town F.C.
 Fleetwood Town F.C.
 Forres Thistle F.C.
 Frome Town F.C.
 Full to Finger Counting, a test used in determining visual field

See also 

 FTAFC